Capital Dynamics is an independent global asset management firm focusing on private assets, including private equity (primaries, secondaries co-investments), private credit, and clean energy. Created in 1988, the firm has offices in Zug, New York, Miami, San Francisco, London, Birmingham, Munich, Hong Kong, Tokyo, Dubai, Milan, Paris, and Seoul . As of Q3 2021, Capital Dynamics oversees more than USD 13 billion in assets under management and advisement1, and employs approximately 160 workers globally across 14 offices in Europe, the Middle East, North America, and Asia.

1As of September 30, 2021. Assets Under Management are calculated based on the total commitments as of the final closing date for all funds currently managed by Capital Dynamics, including amounts that have been distributed.  Assets Under Advisement includes assets for which Capital Dynamics provides services such as reporting, monitoring and risk management.

Key people 

 Hina Ahmad – Managing Director, Chief Operating Officer (COO) and member of the Executive Committee
Andrew Bernstein – Senior Managing Director, Co-Head of Private Equity and member of the Private Equity Investment Committee as well as the Executive Committee
Dario Bertagna, Managing Director, Co-Head of Clean Energy, and member of the Executive Committee
Barney Coles, Managing Director, Co-Head of Clean Energy, and member of the Executive Committee
Simon Eaves, Senior Managing Director, Co-Head of Clean Energy, and member of the Executive Committee
 Jens Ernberg – Managing Director, Co-head of Private Credit, member of the Private Credit Investment Committee as well as the Executive Committee
Bryn Gostin – Managing Director, Head of Product Development & Strategy, and member of the Executive Committee
 Martin Hahn – current Chief Executive Officer (CEO), Head of Business Development and Chairman of the Executive Committee
 Thomas Hall – Managing Director, Co-head of Private Credit, member of the Private Credit Investment Committee as well as the Executive Committee
Carolin Hirschbiel, Managing Director, Head of marketing & Communications, and member of the Executive Committee
George Georgiou – Managing Director and member of the Executive Committee 
Thomas Kubr – founding Chief Executive Officer (CEO) and Executive Chairman of the Board 
 Harald Zeiter – Senior Managing Director, Group General Counsel, Head of Legal and Compliance and member of the Executive Committee
 Joe Marks – Senior Managing Director, Head of Secondaries and member of Executive Committee

References 

 Another Firm Jumps Into Private Credit(Institutional Investor, September 2017)
 The 100 Most Influential of the Decade, Tom Kubr (Private Equity International, Page 6, 2011)
 Major Firms Join Forces to Form the AltExchange Alliance for the Private Equity Industry (AltExchange, May 2013)
 FN 40 Under 40 Rising Stars of Private Equity (Financial News, April 2014)
 Method and system for modeling and benchmarking private equity and applications of same US 7698196 B1 (Google Patents, April 2012)
 FN 40 Under 40 Rising Stars of Private Equity (Financial News, May 2013)
 Industry heavy hitters strike again (Financial News, September 2011)
 Capital Dynamics’ emulated methods help deliver prize (Private Equity News, October 2008)
 2013 Sandro Buttaci Memorial Award for the Young Compliance Officer of the Year Traci Pham, Vice President, Capital Dynamics (Thomson Reuters, November 2013)
 Value Creation in Private Equity - New joint research findings from the Technical University of Munich and Capital Dynamics (Friedrich-Alexander-University Erlangen-Nuremberg, 2014)
 New Strategies for Risk Management in Private Equity (Private Equity International, May 2014)
 Team Stability and Performance in Private Equity (London Business School’s Coller Institute of Private Equity, October 2013)
 Value Creation in Danish Private Equity (Danish Venture Capital Association, May 2011)
 Value Creation in Private Equity, New CEFS study on value creation drivers in private equity transactions (Center for Entrepreneurial and Financial Studies at the Technical University of Munich, October 2009)
 Private equity’s love affair with leverage (Financial Times Fund Management, October 2009)
 Responsible Investment:  A guide for private equity and venture capital firms, Page 1 (British Private Equity & Venture Capital Association, 2012)  
 Europe’s Most Influential PE Fund Managers (Deal Market Digest on Private Equity News’ Survey Results, September 2012)
 
 

Companies based in Zug
Financial services companies established in 1988
Private equity firms of Switzerland